Clarkson Valley is a city in St. Louis County, Missouri, United States. The population was 2,609 at the 2020 census.

Geography
Clarkson Valley is located at  (38.617353, -90.588218).

Demographics

Clarkson Valley is an affluent St. Louis suburb.

2020 census 
As of the census of 2020, there were 2,609 people, 936 households, and 824 families living in the city. The racial makeup of the city was 88.8% White, 1.3% African American, 4.0% Asian, 0.0% Pacific Islander, 0.8% from other races, and 4.4% from two or more races. Hispanic or Latino of any race were 3.3% of the population.

There were 936 households, of which 21.7% had children under the age of 18 living with them, 88.0% were married couples living together, 6.2% had a female householder with no husband present, and 5.8% had a male householder with no wife present. The average family size was 2.96%

The median age in the city was 51.8 years. 21.7% of residents were under the age of 18;  3.1% were under the age of 5; 12.8% were from 5 to 14;  5.9% were from 15 to 17; and 27.6% were 65 years of age or older. 

The gender makeup of the city was 51.0% male and 48.9% female.

2010 census 
As of the census of 2010, there were 2,632 people, 882 households, and 801 families living in the city. The racial makeup of the city was 92.9% White, 1.5% African American, 3.5% Asian, 0.2% Pacific Islander, 0.6% from other races, and 1.3% from two or more races. Hispanic or Latino of any race were 2.2% of the population.

There were 882 households, of which 40.8% had children under the age of 18 living with them, 85.3% were married couples living together, 3.3% had a female householder with no husband present, 2.3% had a male householder with no wife present, and 9.2% were non-families. 7.9% of all households were made up of individuals, and 4.4% had someone living alone who was 65 years of age or older. The average household size was 2.98 and the average family size was 3.14.

The median age in the city was 46.9 years. 27.8% of residents were under the age of 18; 5.6% were between the ages of 18 and 24; 13.1% were from 25 to 44; 39.1% were from 45 to 64; and 14.5% were 65 years of age or older. The gender makeup of the city was 49.7% male and 50.3% female.

2000 census
As of the census of 2000, there were 2,675 people, 884 households, and 818 families living in the city. The racial makeup of the city was 94.17% White, 1.35% African American, 0.19% Native American, 3.21% Asian, 0.11% from other races, and 0.97% from two or more races. Hispanic or Latino of any race were 1.20% of the population.

There were 884 households, out of which 42.2% had children under the age of 18 living with them, 89.8% were married couples living together, 1.2% had a female householder with no husband present, and 7.4% were non-families. 6.0% of all households were made up of individuals, and 1.8% had someone living alone who was 65 years of age or older. The average household size was 3.03 and the average family size was 3.16.

In the city, the population was spread out, with 27.9% under the age of 18, 5.6% from 18 to 24, 19.1% from 25 to 44, 39.7% from 45 to 64, and 7.6% who were 65 years of age or older. The median age was 44 years. For every 100 females, there were 99.3 males. For every 100 females age 18 and over, there were 100.2 males.

The median income for a household in the city was $153,933, and the median income for a family was $156,489. Males had a median income of $100,000 versus $48,438 for females. The per capita income for the city was $63,563. About 0.5% of families and 0.4% of the population were below the poverty line, including none of those under the age of eighteen or sixty-five or over.

References

Cities in St. Louis County, Missouri
Cities in Missouri